Raimondo Scoppa (March 22, 1820 – 1890) was an Italian painter of both historical subjects and landscapes.

Biography
Scoppa was born in Naples.  He studied locally under professors Smargiassi, one of the leaders of the School of Posillipo, and Pottolà at the Academy of Fine Arts of Naples. Among Scoppa's main works is Bice led to the Castle of Rosate, a painting inspired by the novel by Tommaso Grossi about Marco Visconti, a 14th-century condottieri, and awarded a gold medal at an exhibition. The painting was once found in the Reggia of Naples, now in Circolo della Stampa of Naples. He also painted Un dirupo di Capo d'Urso in the province of Salerno, commissioned by the Bourbon King Ferdinand II, and once found in Palace of Caserta, and now in Reggia of Naples. In 1852 he exhibited the prize-winning Christ in the Garden, also completed many land- and seascapes for exhibitions at Florence, Milan, Turin, and other places.

References

1820 births
1890 deaths
19th-century Neapolitan people
19th-century Italian painters
Italian male painters
Painters from Naples
19th-century Italian male artists